The Sydney Storm, originally Sydney Blues were a team in the now defunct Australian Baseball League.  The franchise featured in every post season throughout its existence and won the Claxton Shield once.

History
The Storm were formed for the 1992-93 ABL Championship as the Sydney Blues after purchasing the licence of the Parramatta Patriots. The team was re-branded the Sydney Storm for the 1997-98 season, After legal action taken by Cricket NSW, The franchise owners then changed the team name from Blue to Storm, As the NSW Cricket team was also known as the Blues.

The franchise won one ABL championship under their former name, defeating the Melbourne Reds in the 1995 championship, also finishing runner-up twice - once (as the Blues) against the Brisbane Bandits in 1994, and in the final ABL season in 1999, defeated by the Gold Coast Cougars.

See also 
Sport in Australia
Australian Baseball
Australian Baseball League (1989-1999)

External links
The Australian Baseball League: 1989-1999

Australian Baseball League (1989–1999) teams
Defunct baseball teams in Australia